Gee Langdon (1907–1993) was a British writer, lyricist and composer.

Early life and education
Langdon was born Gladys Annie Joel in Richmond, Surrey, and was educated at the Richmond County School for Girls and St. Hugh's College, Oxford, where she captained the college netball VII and graduated in English. She was the Great Aunt of John Henry Dixon.

Career
Beginning in 1933, Langdon worked as the head of the Conway Library of photographic reproduction at the Courtauld Institute of Art, under Anthony Blunt, as the Archivist of the Royal Geographical Society and, during the Second World War, in a government department in London.  Her research included the analysis of tithe maps, enumeration books, directories and other historical documents to develop a picture of daily life in nineteenth century England.

Langdon is the author of several books, and her songs and lyrics have been recorded by several musical artists.

Selected works

Books

Songs 
 Not the Marrying Kind (written with Elton Hayes, 1953) - recorded by Elton Hayes, Parlophone
 Letter to a Soldier -  recorded by Barbara Lyon, Columbia 1956 - UK #27, Gracie Fields, Decca 1956, Terry Burton, Philips 1956, Annita Ray, Zephyr 1957 and Jane Forrest, Embassy 1957
 The Road to the Stars - recorded by Andy Cole, EMI 1956
 White Wedding (with music by Cyril Watters, 1962) - recorded by Sheila Southern, HMV and Kay Wilson, Ember

References 

1907 births
1993 deaths
British women writers
Alumni of St Hugh's College, Oxford